The British Schools of Montevideo is a private, coeducational, non-profit school, which aims to give an intensive bilingual education, combining the Uruguayan national curriculum with an English language program.

Educational programs and governance
The school offers various English and international examinations, such as the IGCSE and IB (International Baccalaureate) programs.

The school is governed by the Board of Governors, elected by the British Schools Society in Uruguay, whose honorary President is the British Ambassador to Uruguay.

The school also provides Portuguese classes for High School students.

History
The School was founded on 8 October 1908 to satisfy demand from the British community in Uruguay, who had already made their presence felt with the establishment of the British Cemetery, British Hospital and Montevideo Cricket Club. The first classes began in February 1909 at a building located in Juan Blanes Street in downtown Montevideo. Initially there were two separate schools for boys and girls, which is why, despite now being co-educational, it recalls its roots with the word Schools. The schools relocated to Pocitos in 1917 and finished new premises in 1926, with the main building dedicated by President José Serrato at the official opening. Ten years later the boys and girls schools were merged. In 1958 the senior school moved to a purpose built campus in Carrasco and was joined by the junior school in 1965. 

The 70s saw a major change: The British Schools was among the first cohort of international schools to introduce the International Baccalaureate (IB). According to former student Ernesto Talvi, the presence of the IB — in addition to the prospect of learning English — was a pull factor in drawing ambitious parents to send their children to the British Schools, as the IB was seen to open up access to globally prestigious universities. José Amorín Batlle, a fellow alumnus, later recalled that while attendance at the British Schools was associated with the rich and connected, his generation also saw many pupils from professional, middle-class families that were not regarded as wealthy.

While the British Schools is not the most expensive in Montevideo (that is the Uruguayan American School), it is known to be popular with the nouveau riche who, beyond academic excellence, are also looking for a school with social prestige. Politicians who enroll their children tend to be from the Colorado Party or National Party. Today, though the bulk of students do not have a personal connection to the United Kingdom, a few are still descended from British families.

The British school was the first school to play rugby union in Uruguay, and nowadays its alumni club, Old Boys & Old Girls Club, gives the national squad a lot of important players.

Prominent alumni
Prominent alumni include the current president of Uruguay, Luis Alberto Lacalle Pou, current finance minister Azucena Arbeleche, and former government ministers Ernesto Talvi, Pedro Bordaberry, Gabriel Gurméndez Armand-Ugon and José Amorín Batlle. 

Charles Benham Larrabee, from an American expatriate family, was a trial lawyer and Justice on the New Mexico Supreme Court. English author John Andrews, designer Gabriela Hearst, and tennis player Patricia Miller also attended the school. 

There are numerous examples of students who have played rugby for Uruguay, including at least five members of the Uruguay squad at the 2019 Rugby World Cup: Santiago Civetta, Juan Manuel Gaminara, Manuel Leindekar, Juan Manuel Cat, and Andrés Vilaseca.

Noted activities
Each year the school plays different theater musicals, such as Grease, Les Misérables or Fame. For its 100th anniversary, most of the school participated on a version of Miss Saigon. In 2018, the school celebrated their 110th anniversary and the 20th anniversary since they had performed their first senior musical by presenting Grease once more in their theaters. On 2019, the school performed Mamma Mia: The Musical. In 2020 the musical was canceled due to the coronavirus. In 2022, the senior musical productions resumed with The Wedding Singer (musical).

See also

 Old Boys & Old Girls Club

References

Schools in Montevideo
Private schools in Uruguay
International schools in Uruguay
Carrasco, Montevideo
1908 establishments in Uruguay
Educational institutions established in 1908
British immigration to Uruguay